The Bull Terrier is a breed of dog in the terrier family. There is also a miniature version of this breed which is officially known as the Miniature Bull Terrier.

Appearance

The Bull Terrier's most recognizable feature is its head, described as 'egg-shaped head', when viewed from the front; the top of the skull is almost flat. The profile curves gently downwards from the top of the skull to the tip of the nose, which is black and bent downwards at the tip, with well-developed nostrils. The lower jaw is deep and strong. The unique triangular eyes are small, dark, and deep-set. Bull Terriers are the only dogs that have triangular eyes. The body is full and round, with strong, muscular shoulders. The tail is carried horizontally. They are either white, red, fawn, black, brindle, or a combination of these.

Temperament
Bull Terriers can be both independent and stubborn and for this reason are not considered suitable for an inexperienced dog owner. A Bull Terrier has an even temperament and is amenable to discipline. Although obstinate, the breed is described by the Bull Terrier Club as particularly good with people. Early socialization will ensure that the dog will get along with other dogs and animals. Their personality is described as courageous, full of spirit, with a fun-loving attitude, a children-loving dog and a perfect family member. Although the breed has been a target of breed-specific legislation, a 2008 study in Germany did not find that Bull Terriers had any significant temperament difference from Golden Retrievers in overall temperament researches.

Health
Deafness occurs in 20.4% of pure white Bull Terriers and 1.3% of colored Bull Terriers, often being difficult to notice at a young age. Many Bull Terriers have a tendency to develop skin allergies. Insect bites, such as those from fleas, and sometimes mosquitoes and mites, can produce a generalised allergic response of hives, rash, and itching. A UK breed survey puts their median lifespan at 10 years and their mean at 9 years (1 s.f., RSE = 13.87% 2 d. p.), with a good number of dogs living to 10–15 years.

History

At the start of the 19th century, the "bull and terrier" breeds were developed to satisfy the needs for vermin control and animal-based blood sports.  The bull and terriers were based on the Old English Bulldog (now extinct) and Old English Terriers with possible other terriers. This new breed combined the speed and dexterity of lightly built terriers with the dour tenacity of the Bulldog, which was a poor performer in most combat situations, having been bred almost exclusively for fighting bulls and bears tied to a post. Many breeders began to breed bulldogs with terriers, arguing that such a mixture enhances the quality of fighting. Despite the fact that a cross between a bulldog and a terrier was of high value, very little or nothing was done to preserve the breed in its original form. Due to the lack of breed standards—breeding was for performance, not appearance—the "bull and terrier" eventually divided into the ancestors of "Bull Terriers" and "Staffordshire Bull Terriers", both smaller and easier to handle than the progenitor.

In the mid-19th century, James Hinks started breeding bull and terriers with "English White Terriers" (now extinct), looking for a cleaner appearance with better legs and nicer head. In 1862, Hinks entered a dam called "Puss" sired by his white Bulldog called "Madman" into the Bull Terrier Class at the dog show held at the Cremorne Gardens in Chelsea, London. Originally, these dogs did not yet have the now-familiar "egg face", but kept the stop in the skull profile.
The dog was immediately popular and breeding continued, using Dalmatian, Spanish Pointer, and Whippet to increase elegance and agility; and Borzoi and Rough Collie to reduce the stop. Hinks wanted his dogs white, and bred specifically for this. The first modern Bull Terrier is now recognized as "Lord Gladiator", from 1917, being the first dog with no stop at all.

Due to medical problems associated with all-white breeding, Ted Lyon among others began introducing color, using Stafford shire Bull Terriers in the early 20th century. Colored Bull Terriers were recognized as a separate variety (at least by the AKC) in 1936. Brindle is the preferred color, but other colors are welcome.

Along with conformation, specific behavior traits were sought.

Noted Bull Terriers

Theodore Roosevelt owned several pets, including the Bull Terrier Pete. Pete received plenty of contemporary press, having bitten a naval clerk as well as chased and bitten the French ambassador.
General George S. Patton owned a Bull Terrier named Willie. The dog had belonged to a fallen RAF pilot, and Patton bought him in England in 1944.  When it got into a fight with Dwight D. Eisenhower's dog, Patton apologized, saying that Willie was outranked and would be confined to quarters.
In the 1963 film The Incredible Journey, based on Sheila Burnford's novel of the same name, a female bull terrier named Muffy played the part of Old Bodger, the eldest of the three animals.
Spuds MacKenzie is a fictional character used for an extensive advertising campaign marketing Bud Light beer in the late 1980s, portrayed by a bull terrier named Honey Tree Evil Eye.
Bullseye (formerly known as Spot) is a Miniature Bull Terrier and currently the official mascot of Target Corporation.

See also
 Dogs portal
 List of dog breeds
 Boston Terrier
 Bulldog
 French Bulldog

References

External links

FCI breeds
Terriers
Dog breeds originating in England
Dog fighting breeds